A hitter is a player batting in baseball.

Designated hitter
Pinch hitter
Switch hitter

The Hitter may refer to:
The Hitter (film)
"The Hitter", song by Bruce Springsteen from Devils & Dust